Golești may refer to several places in Romania:

Golești, Vâlcea, a commune in Vâlcea County
Golești, Vrancea, a commune in Vrancea County
Golești, a village in Bălilești Commune, Argeș County
Golești, a village in Ștefănești, Argeș town, Argeș County
Goleștii de Sus, a village in Cotești Commune, Vrancea County

See also
Schitu Golești, a commune in Argeș County, Romania
Golescu (disambiguation)